The Mixed relay race of the 2019 IAAF World Cross Country Championships was run in Aarhus in Denmark on 30 March 2019, with 10 teams of four athletes each, two men and two women, taking part.

Results
The race began at 11:01 local time.

After the race, Morocco and China were disqualified for handing over the timing wristband (used as a relay baton) outside the designated takeover zone. Morocco were reinstated after an appeal.

See also
2017 IAAF World Cross Country Championships – Mixed relay
2019 IAAF World Cross Country Championships
Senior men's race
Senior women's race
Junior men's race
Junior women's race

References

mixed relay
Mixed relay race at the World Athletics Cross Country Championships